Horní Bečva is a municipality and village in Vsetín District in the Zlín Region of the Czech Republic. It has about 2,400 inhabitants.

Geography
Horní Bečva is a typical highland municipality nestled in the heart of Moravian-Silesian Beskids mountain range. The river Rožnovská Bečva flows through the municipality.

History
The first written mention of Horní Bečva is from 1659.

References

External links

 

Villages in Vsetín District
Moravian Wallachia